Rubber seed oil is oil extracted from the seeds of rubber trees. In the latex manufacturing process, rubber seeds are not historically collected and commercialized. Recent analysis shows that rubber seed oil contained the following fatty acids:

Palmitic (C16:0) - 0.2%
Stearic (C18:0) - 8.7%
Oleic (C18:1) - 24.6%
Linoleic (C18:2) - 39.6%
Linolenic (C18:3) - 16.3%

In India and other rubber manufacturing areas, rubber seeds are used to feed livestock. In India Virudhunagar District A company Index International Extract oil from Rubber seeds and uses that rubber seed cake for cattle feed purpose.  Although rubber seed is rich in nutrients, it also contains cyanogenic glycosides which will release prussic acid in the presence of enzymes or in slightly acidic conditions.
Oil from the rubber seed is also of commercial importance. Hitherto, rubber seed has largely been allowed to waste with very little used for raising root stock seedlings for propagation purposes.  The useful properties of the rubber seed oil make it similar to well-known linseed and soybean oil. Rubber seed oil also could be used for the paint industry as a semidrying oil, in the manufacture of soap, for the production of linoleum and  alkyd resin; in medicine as antimalaria oil; and in engineering as core binder  for factice preparation, and the cake left after oil extraction is used in fertilizer preparation and as feed for cattle and poultry. 
The potential of rubber wood as a source of timber is recognized in India, Sri Lanka, Indonesia, and Malaysia, with an increasing volume of sawn rubber wood used for furniture manufacturing and a variety of other applications.

See also
Biofuels

References

Oils
Rubber
Biofuels